John Noonan is an Australian international lawn bowler.

Bowls career
Noonan became the Australian national champion after winning the 1994 Australian National Bowls Championships singles title. Two years later in 1996, he won the Hong Kong International Bowls Classic singles title.

Noonan then won a silver medal at the 1997 Asia Pacific Bowls Championships, held in Warilla, Australia.

References

Australian male bowls players
Living people
Year of birth missing (living people)